Arhansus is a commune in the Pyrénées-Atlantiques department in the Nouvelle-Aquitaine region of south-western France.

The inhabitants of the commune are known as Arhantsusiar or Arhantsusitar.

Geography

Arhansus is located in the former basque province of Lower Navarre some 10 km south of Saint-Palais and 8 km north-east of Larceveau-Arros-Cibits. Access to the commune is solely by country roads with at least two country roads connecting the village to the D933 road from Larceveau-Arros-Cibrits to Uhart-Mixe which passes outside and parallel to the western border of the commune. The commune consists almost entirely of farmland with a few small patches of forest.

The Bidouze river forms the western border of the commune flowing north with two small streams rising in the commune and joining it. One stream is the northern border of the commune.

Places and Hamlets

 Aguerrengoyhenko Borda (ruins)
 Bidartia
 Bordaberria
 Carricondoa
 Castellu Cahara or Gastelusare
 Charcoa
 Cuçuluteguia
 Elgartia
 Etchessaria
 Eyhera
 Eyheraberria
 Goyhenetchea
 Haramberria
 Harispouria
 Hirrundoya
 Inchaurrague
 Ithurbidia
 Larrondoa
 Lastapia
 Mendionda
 Olieta
 Portasanse
 Solaquia
 Uligainia

Toponymy
The commune's name in basque is Arhantsusi (or Arhantsuse). The name is based on the basque radical Arhan-, Arran- from where Arhantz is derived but the etymology "where blackthorn abounds" is uncertain.

The following table details the origins of the commune name and other names in the commune.

Sources:
Orpustan: Jean-Baptiste Orpustan,   New Basque Toponymy
Raymond: Topographic Dictionary of the Department of Basses-Pyrenees, 1863, on the page numbers indicated in the table. 
Cassini: Cassini Map from 1750

Origins:
Pamplona: Titles of Pamplona

History

Heraldry

Administration

List of Successive Mayors

Inter-communality
Arhansus is part of seven inter-communal structures:
 the Communauté d'agglomération du Pays Basque;
 the AEP association of Ostabaret;
 the Energy association of Pyrénées-Atlantiques;
 the inter-communal association for the single purpose of Oztibarre Garbi;
 the inter-communal association for the development and management of the slaughterhouse at Saint-Jean-Pied-de-Port;
 the association for the operation of schools in Ostibarret;
 the association to support Basque culture.

Demography
In 2017 the commune had 74 inhabitants.

Economy
Economic activity is mainly agricultural. the commune is part of the Appellation d'origine contrôlée (AOC) zone of Ossau-iraty.

Culture and Heritage

Civil Heritage
Several sites in Arhansus are registered as historical monuments:
The Protohistoric Camp at Castellu Cahara at an altitude of 361m
A second Protohistoric Camp at Portasanse.
Houses and Farms (18th-19th century)

Religious Heritage

The Parish Church of Saint-Étienne (15th century) is registered as an historical monument.

The Church

Hilarri in Arhansus

See also
Communes of the Pyrénées-Atlantiques department

References

External links
Arhansus on Géoportail, National Geographic Institute (IGN) website 
Arhansus on the 1750 Cassini Map

Communes of Pyrénées-Atlantiques
Lower Navarre